45 Fathers is a 1937 American comedy film directed by James Tinling, written by Frances Hyland and Albert Ray, and starring Jane Withers, Thomas Beck, Louise Henry, Richard Carle, Nella Walker and Andrew Tombes. It was released on November 26, 1937, by 20th Century Fox.

Plot
The plot is built around a group of old men that decide to adopt an orphan girl, once adopted she dances, sings and does whatever she can to help around.

Cast   
Jane Withers as Judith Frazier
Thomas Beck as Roger Farragut
Louise Henry as Elizabeth Carter
Paul Hartman as Joe McCoy
Grace Hartman as Flo McCoy
Richard Carle as Bunny Carothers
Nella Walker as Mrs. Carter
Andrew Tombes as Judge
Leon Ames as Vincent
Sammy Cohen as Prof. Ziska
George Givot as Prof. Bellini
Ruth Warren as Sarah
Hattie McDaniel as Beulah
Romaine Callender as Hastings

References

External links 
 

1937 films
20th Century Fox films
American comedy films
1937 comedy films
Films directed by James Tinling
American black-and-white films
Films scored by Samuel Kaylin
1930s English-language films
1930s American films